Highland Parks is a neighborhood in northwest Lexington, Kentucky, United States. It is a new subdivision started in the mid-2000s, located between the older Highlands and Oakwood neighborhoods. It is located south of Birch Drive and north of Boxwood Drive. It is bounded by Georgetown Road to the west and Oakwood Park to the east.

Neighborhood statistics
 Area: 
 Population: 108
 Population density: 851 people per square mile
 Median household income: $59,111

References

Neighborhoods in Lexington, Kentucky